Driekloof Dam is a small section of the Sterkfontein Dam, Free State, South Africa. The water is pumped to Driekloof during times of low national power consumption (generally over weekends) and released back into Kilburn through four  turbine generators in times of high electricity demand.

The scheme is operated in such a way that there is a net pumping of up to /annum depending upon the water availability in the Tugela catchment (Woodstock Dam) as well as the need for augmentation in the Vaal Dam catchment.

References

Dams completed in 1979
Energy infrastructure completed in 1979
Dams in South Africa
Hydroelectric power stations in South Africa
20th-century architecture in South Africa